Newton Junction is an unincorporated community in the town of Newton in Rockingham County, New Hampshire. It is located in the western portion of Newton, between the main portion of Newton (to the east) and South Kingston (to the west).

Amtrak's Downeaster railroad line passes through the village, but does not have a stop. The nearest Downeaster stations are Haverhill, Massachusetts, to the south, and Exeter, New Hampshire, to the north. The West Amesbury Branch Railroad once led southeast from Newton Junction to Merrimac, Massachusetts.

Although it is not a town, "Newton Junction" is a valid address used for the 03859 ZIP code in Newton (post office boxes only).

References

Unincorporated communities in Rockingham County, New Hampshire
Unincorporated communities in New Hampshire